The Dinner is an 2017 American drama film directed and written by Oren Moverman, and based on the Dutch novel of the same name by Herman Koch. It is the third film adaptation of the novel, following the 2013 original Dutch version Het Diner by Menno Meyjes and the 2014 Italian film I nostri ragazzi by Ivano De Matteo. The film stars Richard Gere, Steve Coogan, Laura Linney, Rebecca Hall, Chloë Sevigny, Charlie Plummer, Miles J. Harvey, and Adepero Oduye.

The Dinner had its world premiere at the Berlin Film Festival on February 10, 2017, and was theatrically released on May 5, 2017, by The Orchard.

Plot
On a snowy evening in Dobbs Ferry, history teacher Paul Lohman, his wife Claire, Paul's congressman brother Stan, and Stan's wife Katelyn meet for an organized dinner at a luxury restaurant that Stan has booked for the four of them. Before dinner, Paul and Claire discuss their son Michael, who is closer to her than him. Paul and Stan appear to have a contentious relationship.

Stan, the front runner for governor, is accompanied to dinner by his aides, who frequently interrupt the meal. Paul is annoyed by Stan and lets everyone know.

In a flashback, Michael and his cousins Rick and Beau (Stan’s children with ex-wife Barbara, Beau is adopted) encounter a homeless woman trying to sleep in the ATM building that they need to use to get money for a cab ride home. Michael verbally and physically harasses the woman while Rick and Beau look on. Michael dumps trash on the woman while taunting her. After throwing near-empty cans of flammable material on her, Michael throws lit matches on her sleeping bag, one of which catches fire and kills her. Michael, who is laughing as he watches the woman burn, records the event on his cell phone. Beau leaves before the death occurred but witnesses it as an unprovoked attack.

Throughout the dinner, tensions build up among the group intercut with flashbacks that view the dysfunctional family's past, and Stan's attempts to help Paul in his depression. The arguments grow tense as they clash on whether the boys should take the blame or simply cover up their wrongdoing.

Another flashback shows Claire's bout with cancer. In the present day, Paul finds out that there is a video of the homeless woman's death online that Beau uploaded after he found it on Michael's computer. Michael refuses to delete the video, which causes a schism between him and his father. Paul is also shocked to find that not only does Claire know about the incident (which he thought he was keeping secret from her), she is colluding with Michael in a scheme to pay hush money to Beau.

In another flashback, after Stan and his first wife offer to look after Michael while Claire is in the hospital, Paul becomes angry and hits him over the head with a saucepan. At the dinner, Stan says he wants to withdraw from the gubernatorial race and hold a press conference about the ATM incident, later accompanying his son to the police. A bitter argument ensues between Stan on one side and Claire and Katelyn on the other, with Paul sitting quietly away from the table. Katelyn persuades Stan to hold off on his plan.

Convinced that Stan and Kate are prepared to turn in both Michael and Rick, Claire and Paul discuss the need to take care of Beau. Paul admits that he has been off his medications for a few months; Claire admits she has known that, but said nothing because she wanted Paul back. She tells Paul that he needs to "take care" of Beau. When he asks her what she means, she says, after a moment's hesitation, that he needs to "talk" with Beau, and convince him not to turn in their son.

Paul leaves the restaurant for Stan's house looking for Beau, believing that the only solution to the problem is to kill him. Beau leaves the house to talk to Paul, who grabs him by the neck and prepares to hit Beau over the head with a rock to prevent him from turning in the other boys. Paul is confronted by an enraged Stan alongside Katelyn and Claire. While Katelyn tries to phone Beau, a call comes into Stan's aide that the votes needed for the mental health bill are secure. The film ends on an abrupt note as Paul refers to everyone as "apes with phones" and groans in pain. Although no one can reach Beau on his cell phone, Paul says he was just talking to him.

Cast 

 Richard Gere as Stan Lohman, a congressman who is running for governor
 Steve Coogan as Paul Lohman, brother to Stan and a former high school history teacher
 Laura Linney as Claire Lohman, Paul's wife
 Rebecca Hall as Katelyn Lohman, Stan's wife
 Chloë Sevigny as Barbara Lohman, Stan's ex-wife
 Charlie Plummer as Michael Lohman, the only son of Claire and Paul
 Adepero Oduye as Nina, who works for Stan
 Michael Chernus as Dylan Heinz
 Taylor Rae Almonte as Kamryn Velez
 Joel Bissonnette as Antonio
 Seamus Davey-Fitzpatrick as Rick Lohman, Stan and Barbara's son
 Miles J. Harvey as Beau Lohman, Stan and Barbara's adopted son
 Laura Hajek as Anna, Michael's girlfriend

Production 
On September 19, 2013, it was announced that Cate Blanchett would make her directorial debut with a film adaptation of the Dutch thriller novel The Dinner, by Herman Koch, scripted by Oren Moverman. Caldecot Chubb produced under his ChubbCo Film banner, and Lawrence Inglee, Eddie Vaisman and Julia Lebedev produced the film for Code Red, ChubbCo and Blackbird. Code Red fully financed the film and Protagonist Pictures handled international sales. Olga Segura and Eva Maria Daniels executive produced and helped with the development of the project.

Later, in January 2016, it was announced that Moverman would also direct the film. That same month, Charlie Plummer and Adepero Oduye joined the cast of the film.

Filming
Principal photography on the film began on January 21, 2016, in Dobbs Ferry, New York. Filming later took place in Gettysburg, Pennsylvania, including at the Gettysburg National Military Park.

Release
In May 2016, The Orchard acquired distribution rights to the film. The film had its world premiere at the Berlin International Film Festival on February 10, 2017, and went on to screen at the Tribeca Film Festival on April 24, 2017. The film was theatrically released on May 5, 2017.

Critical reception
The Dinner holds a 46% approval rating on review aggregator website Rotten Tomatoes, based on 142 reviews, with an average rating of 5.5/10. The website's critical consensus reads, "The Dinner'''s strong ensemble isn't enough to overcome a screenplay that merely skims the surface of its source material's wit and insight." On Metacritic, the film holds a rating of 57 out of 100, based on 30 critics, indicating "mixed or average reviews".

Owen Gleiberman of Variety gave the film a positive review, writing: "Richard Gere, Laura Linney, Steve Coogan, and Rebecca Hall make a riveting quartet in Oren Moverman's adaptation of the Herman Koch novel about a dark-hearted dinner gathering." Eric Kohn of IndieWire also gave the film a positive review, writing: "The Dinner mostly works so long as it stays at the table, and the unresolvable source of anxiety in play suggests that on some level, the meal never ends." Boyd van Hoeij of The Hollywood Reporter'' gave the film a negative review, writing: "By trying to keep the prolonged sit-down affair from becoming excessively stagey, Moverman adds too many distracting flashbacks to maintain the original's hard-hitting and well-aimed gut punch."

References

External links 

 
 

2017 films
2017 crime drama films
American crime drama films
American nonlinear narrative films
American remakes of Dutch films
Films directed by Oren Moverman
Films with screenplays by Oren Moverman
Films based on Dutch novels
Films shot in Pennsylvania
Films set in Amsterdam
Films set in restaurants
Films shot in New York (state)
The Orchard (company) films
Vertigo Films films
Icon Productions films
2010s English-language films
2010s American films